The Bible 2 is the sixth studio album by Arizona-based folk punk band AJJ. It was released on August 18, 2016. The album was the first released after the band officially changed their name to AJJ in February 2016.

The album has been described by critics as "punchy, clever, and absurdist."

History
The band performed several of the album's songs on the preceding tour. Songs like "Goodbye, Oh Goodbye", "Cody's Theme", "Golden Eagle", "Small Red Boy", "When I'm A Dead Boy", and "No More Shame, No More Fear, No More Dread" were played live prior to the album announcement.

The Bible 2 was announced on July 7, 2016. It was accompanied by the release of the song and music video for "Goodbye, Oh Goodbye", as well as an updated website with pre-order bundles. The pre-order bundles included a safe that was designed to look like a book, a T-shirt, a skateboard deck printed with the lyrics of "When I'm A Dead Boy", as well as colored vinyl options for pre-ordering.

On August 1, 2016, the music video for "Junkie Church" was released. From August 4 through to August 12, the band released one song per day via the band's Bandcamp page in the track list order. By August 12, the entire album was available to listen to for free on Bandcamp.

Track listing

Charts

Personnel

AJJ
Sean Bonnette - lead vocals, rhythm guitar
Ben Gallaty - bass guitar, double bass, backing vocals
Preston Bryant - keyboards, piano, lead guitar, backing vocals
Mark Glick - cello
Deacon Batchelor - drums, percussion

Production
John Congleton
Alex Bhore

Mastering
Alan Douches

Artwork
Sean Bonnette

Layout
Rachel Harper
Christina Johns

References 

2016 albums
AJJ (band) albums
SideOneDummy Records albums